"Alright" is a song co-written and recorded by American singer Darius Rucker, lead vocalist of the rock band Hootie & the Blowfish.  It was released in April 2009 as the third single from his first country music album Learn to Live.  Rucker co-wrote the song with producer Frank Rogers.

Content
"Alright" is a mid-tempo in which the male narrator lists off the various pleasantries that he does not need, such as fancy food and wine. He then lists off what he does have, and says that he is "alright" because of it. Rucker wrote the song with Frank Rogers, who produced the album. The two had already written the song "All I Want," in which the divorced narrator wishes to be left alone; after writing that song, Rucker decided to invert the theme and write a song about a man who is happily married.

Music video
A music video for the song debuted in June 2009. It is directed by Wayne Isham, who directed the videos for Rucker's previous two singles. Using various types of camera shots and angles, it features Rucker sing the song in various places in Venice, CA, sometimes within a crowd of people, and various depictions of everyday life. The video was voted in #34 on GAC's Top 50 Videos of the Year list.

Critical reception
Dan Milliken of Country Universe gave the song a D rating. He criticized the song's theme, which he considered highly overused and "dumbed-down", but added that Rucker's vocals showed a sense of personality. Engine 145 reviewer Karlie Justus gave a thumbs-down rating, saying that the song is "a peppy piece of commercial fluff that will fare well on country radio. Unfortunately, despite the pervasive steel guitar, [Capitol Records executive Mike] Dungan is correct—it's a lot more Hootie and a lot less Haggard."

Chart performance
"Alright" debuted at number 56 on the Hot Country Songs chart for the chart week of April 25, 2009. The song entered the Top 40 in its third chart week. The song has become Rucker's third consecutive Number 1 single on the country charts, as well as third consecutive solo Top 40 pop hit. With its ascent to Number 1, Rucker has become the first country music singer since Wynonna Judd to send his or her first three singles to the top of the country charts. It has sold 1,197,000 copies in the US as of May 2013.

Year-end charts

Certifications

References

2009 singles
Darius Rucker songs
Music videos directed by Wayne Isham
Songs written by Darius Rucker
Songs written by Frank Rogers (record producer)
Song recordings produced by Frank Rogers (record producer)
Capitol Records Nashville singles
2008 songs